Keith Shepherd (born 21 October 1947) is a Canadian former alpine skier who competed in the 1968 Winter Olympics.

References

1947 births
Living people
Canadian male alpine skiers
Olympic alpine skiers of Canada
Alpine skiers at the 1968 Winter Olympics